The Pennsylvania Governor's Cup Stakes is an American Thoroughbred horse race held annually at Penn National Race Course since 1973. The race was run in two divisions in 1973. It was a Grade III event from 1982 through 1989.

Race distances & surface:
1973–1979 : 1-1/16 miles on dirt
1979–2001 : 1-1/16 miles on turf
2002–2006 : 5 furlongs on turf
2007 : 5 furlongs on dirt
2008–present : 5 furlongs on turf

Records
Speed record: 
 5 furlongs on turf : 2002, Bop, 0:54.61
 1-1/16 miles on turf : 1980, Told, 1:38 flat
 1-1/16 miles on dirt : 1978, A Letter To Harry, 1:41.20

Most wins:
 2 – Tightend Touchdown (2013, 2014)

Most wins by a jockey:
 3 – Javier Castellano (2008, 2013, 2014)

Most wins by a trainer:
 2 – Daniel Perlsweig (1973, 1974)
 2 – H. Allen Jerkens (1979, 1983)
 2 – Jason Servis (2013, 2014)
 2 – King T. Leatherbury (2007, 2011)
 2 – Michael J. Trombetta (2002, 2006)
 2 – Michael W. Dickinson (1990, 1996)

Most wins by an owner:
 2 – Thomas G. McClay (2006, 2012)
 2 – Mr. Amore Stables (2013, 2014)

Winners

 *1976: Visier won race but was disqualified to third.

References

Horse races in Pennsylvania
Ungraded stakes races in the United States
Open sprint category horse races
Previously graded stakes races in the United States
Recurring sporting events established in 1973
Grantville, Pennsylvania